Fensmark is the second largest town in Næstved Municipality on the south central part of the Danish island of Zealand. It is located about 6 km northeast of Næstved and has a population of 5,110 (1 January 2022)

Fensmark was the municipal seat of the former Holmegaard Municipality, until it was merged with four other municipalities to form the new Næstved Municipality on 1 January 2007.

Notable people

The Danish lyric poet Christian Winther (1796–1876) was born in Fensmark.

References

Cities and towns in Region Zealand